Kapalua Resort is a golf and beach resort in Kapalua, Hawaii on the northwest shore of the island of Maui near Lahaina, Hawaii. It is owned by Maui Land & Pineapple Company.

Description
Three beaches and the Kapalua Adventures zipline tours and activities are nearby. In the resort are the  Kapalua Spa, and a variety of restaurants and shops, including the historic Honolua Store. Kapalua Farms sells organic produce and eggs to resort restaurants and the Maui community as well as Pineapple farm tours.

Kapalua Resort include several residential communities, from mountain slopes to beach front: the Kapalua Ritz-Carlton Hotel; several vacation home rental programs, and the Kapalua Tennis Garden complex. Other services include the Kapalua Adventure Center and the Cafe Kapalua bistro.

Golf

The resort has two golf courses: The Bay Course and The Plantation Course. The Bay Course meanders around historic buildings and tropical gardens to the coastline. It was the host course to the Kapalua LPGA Classic, a full-field tournament on the LPGA Tour in 2008.  The Plantation Course is a traditional links style course with panoramic mountain and ocean views. It is home to the season-opening event on the PGA Tour, the winners-only Sentry Tournament of Champions, each January. Formerly sponsored by Mercedes-Benz, in 2010 and 2017 it was sponsored by the Seoul Broadcasting System, and between 2011-16 it was sponsored by Hyundai Motor Company. In 2018, the event became sponsored by Sentry Insurance.

The Plantation Course is unique among PGA Tour courses in several ways. It is the only course on the tour that plays to par 73; all others play to pars between 70 and 72. It is also the only course with seven holes of more than 500 yards, but at the same time is one of only two courses (Pebble Beach being the other) with six par-4s of less than 400 yards. The elevation changes on the course are starkly illustrated by looking at the 17th, 18th, and 1st holes as a set. The 17th starts atop a mountain, and the course slopes downward through the 18th, with the 1st completing the descent. These three holes play to a combined 1,691 yards for the tour professionals, with only the 18th (at 663 yards) being par-5.

The Plantation Course and The Bay Course are owned by TY Management. On April 1, 2011, Troon Golf was selected to oversee the golf operations at both courses.

History
Colin Cameron, son of J. Walter Cameron (1895–1976) and grandson of Henry Alexander Baldwin (1871–1946) founded the resort.
It is operated by the Maui Land & Pineapple Company. The name kapa lua means "two borders" in the Hawaiian language. The beach was called "Fleming's" after David Thomas Fleming (1881-1955) manager of Honolua Ranch, who introduced pineapple as a major crop to the area. His 1915 house became the Pineapple Hill restaurant in 1964 until it closed in 1996.

A new spa was going to be developed by Miraval resorts, but the partnership was terminated in May 2005.

References

External links 
 
Golf course website

Golf clubs and courses in Hawaii
Buildings and structures in Maui County, Hawaii
Tourist attractions in Maui County, Hawaii
Resorts in Hawaii